Clube de Futebol Caniçal also known as CF Caniçal is a Portuguese football club from Machico, Madeira and founded in 1981. CF Caniçal currently plays in the Campeonato de Portugal. They currently play their home games at  Campo de Futebol do Caniçal in Machico, Madeira with a capacity of 1000. Their current chairman is Emanuel Moniz Melim and the current manager is Bizarro.

Honours
 Terceira Divisão – Serie E: 1
2006–07
 AF Madeira Championship: 2
1996–97, 2004–05

Current squad

External links
 CF Caniçal official site (Portuguese)

Football clubs in Portugal
Association football clubs established in 1981
1981 establishments in Portugal
Machico